Lee Frederick (June 2, 1912 – June 6, 1993) also credited as Robert Peyton) was an American film actor active during the 1950s. He played the lead character of an intelligence officer in the 1951 espionage thriller Tokyo File 212 opposite Florence Marly. Critic Robert J. Lentz called his performance "solid".

Filmography

References

External links
 

American male film actors
20th-century American male actors
1912 births
1993 deaths
People from Minneapolis